Esther González (born 26 June 1995) is a Mexican swimmer. She competed in the women's 200 metre breaststroke event at the 2017 World Aquatics Championships.

References

1995 births
Living people
Mexican female swimmers
Place of birth missing (living people)
Swimmers at the 2015 Pan American Games
Swimmers at the 2019 Pan American Games
Female breaststroke swimmers
Pan American Games competitors for Mexico
21st-century Mexican women